Saleh Eid Al-Mehaizaa (born 8 October 1965) is a Qatari footballer. He competed in the men's tournament at the 1984 Summer Olympics.

References

External links
 Player's profile
 

1965 births
Living people
Qatari footballers
Qatar international footballers
Qatar Stars League players
Olympic footballers of Qatar
Footballers at the 1984 Summer Olympics
Place of birth missing (living people)
Association football midfielders